Goodbye is an album by Swedish pianist Bobo Stenson recorded in 2004 and released on the ECM label.

Reception
The Allmusic review by Thom Jurek awarded the album 3½ stars stating "Goodbye is one of, if not the most expansive and diverse collections pianist Bobo Stenson has ever released... Goodbye is more a recording of songs than jazz pieces -- at least in a traditional sense. This trio doesn't swing, they play, they slowly dance through the lyric pieces found here".

Track listing
All compositions by Anders Jormin except as indicated.

 "Send in the Clowns" (Stephen Sondheim) - 4:16
 "Rowan" - 6:05
 "Alfonsina" (Ariel Ramírez) - 5:11
 "There Comes a Time" (Tony Williams) - 6:42
 "Song About Earth" (Vladimir Vysotsky) - 7:16
 "Seli" - 8:49
 "Goodbye" (Gordon Jenkins) - 6:39
 "Music for a While" (Henry Purcell) - 5:20
 "Allegretto Rubato" - 5:27
 "Jack Of Clubs" (Paul Motian) - 2:57
 "Sudan" (Motian) - 2:36
 "Queer Street" (Stenson) - 2:09
 "Triple Play" - 2:01
 "Race Face" (Ornette Coleman) - 4:39

Personnel
Bobo Stenson — piano
Anders Jormin — bass
Paul Motian — drums

References

ECM Records albums
Bobo Stenson albums
2005 albums
Albums produced by Manfred Eicher